William H. Edwards (May 14, 1861 – August 16, 1944) was a member of the Wisconsin State Assembly and the Wisconsin State Senate.

Biography
Edwards was born in Lisbon, Waukesha County, Wisconsin. He graduated from what is now Carroll University.

Career
Edwards was elected to the Senate in 1930. Previously, he had been a member of the Assembly from 1915 to 1923 and again from 1925 to 1929. Additionally, he was Clerk of Sussex, Wisconsin as well as Chairman of the Waukesha County, Wisconsin Board and Supervisor of Waukesha County. He was a Republican.

He died in his home in Sussex, aged 83.

References

People from Lisbon, Waukesha County, Wisconsin
County supervisors in Wisconsin
Republican Party Wisconsin state senators
Republican Party members of the Wisconsin State Assembly
Carroll University alumni
1861 births
1944 deaths